Connecticut's 71st House of Representatives district elects one member of the Connecticut House of Representatives. It consists of the town of Middlebury and parts of Waterbury. It has been represented by Republican William Pizzuto since 2022.

List of representatives

Recent elections

2022 special

2020

2018

2016

2014

2012

References

71